rail linc is a brand name applied to routes formerly operating under the now-defunct South East Wales Transport Alliance- but now operating under NAT Group.

History 
In a number of cases, the services were set up sometime after rail services to the villages were axed as part of Dr Beeching's rationalisation of the British Rail network; however some services provide a link to villages that never had a railway station. 

Many Rail Linc routes have been withdrawn due to low ridership.

When the  South East Wales Transport Alliance stood down, control of routes passed over to councils to manage and put out to tender. Caerphilly County Borough Council manage the 901 and Vale of Glamorgan Borough Council manage the 905.

Rail Linc routes

Route 901 
The 901 was previously numbered the RL5 but was brought under the 'Rail Linc' brand as what we know today -  the 901. The service was originally operated by Clarkes Coaches, but liquidated in 2011. The 901 was then operated by VR Travel of Merthyr Tydfil up until 2013 where it sold to NAT Group. NAT still operate the 901 to this day. Previously, the 901 was used using a dedicated Optare Solo and Dennis Dart - but is now run using a branded Alexander Dennis Enviro200 short wheelbase. 

The 901 was however under review by Caerphilly County Borough Council as part of their budget cuts in 2020. As of September 2021, it continues to run hourly Mon-Sat between Blackwood and Ystrad Mynach railway station.

Route 902 

The 902 was previously a route that ran between Maerdy and Ystrad Rhondda railway station, and provided by Thomas of Rhondda. The service was operated using a dedicated Optare Solo. The route ceased in 2012 due to low ridership.

Route 903 
The 903 was previously a route than ran between Rhigos and Aberdare railway station, and provided by Clarkes Coaches. The service was operated using a dedicated Optare Solo. The route ceased in 2011 due to Clarkes Coaches ceasing trading.

The 903 was also previously a route that ran between Rogerstone railway station and Newport railway station and provided by Stagecoach South Wales. The service was operated using a dedicated Optare Solo - but not in all-over Rail Linc two-tone green. It was in standard Stagecoach Beachball livery but had Rail Linc vinyls. The 903 was again withdrawn in 2013 due to low ridership.

Route 904 
The 904 was previously a route that ran between Caerau and Maesteg railway station, and provided by Llynfi Coaches. The service was operated using a dedicated Optare Solo. The route ceased in 2011 due to low ridership.

Route 905 

The 905 is a route that runs between Cardiff Airport and Rhoose Cardiff International Airport railway station, and provided by NAT Group. The service was previously operated by Crossgates Coaches (trading as Veolia Transport Cymru), but passed to NAT Group when Crossgates Coaches ceased trading in 2013. The service was previously operated using a dedicated Optare Solo with Crossgates Coaches, but now NAT Group operate the service using a non-rail linc branded MAN Citysmart, and previously an Optare Tempo.

Route 906 
The 906 was previously a route that ran between Rassau and Ebbw Vale Parkway railway station and provided by Clarkes Coaches. The service was operated using a dedicated Optare Solo. The route ceased in 2011 due to Clarkes Coaches ceasing trading.

Route 907 
The 907 was previously a route that ran between Rogerstone railway station and Newport railway station and provided by Newport Bus. The service was operated using any vehicle that Newport Bus had, but was operated using a dedicated Optare Solo for some of the time that the route was in operation. The route ceased in mid-2010 due to low ridership.

The route was then brought back as the new 903 in 2012, operated by Stagecoach South Wales. See the 'Route 903' section for more information on this.

Route 908 
The 908 was previously a route than ran between Abertillery and Llanhilleth railway station and provided by Henleys Buses. The service was operated using any vehicle that Henleys Buses could use. The route ceased in 2009 due to low ridership.

References

External links
Sewta

Bus transport brands
Bus transport in Wales